Kuzyayev (Russian: Кузяев, Tatar: Хуҗаев) is a Russian masculine surname; its feminine counterpart is Kuzyayeva. It may refer to
Adyam Kuzyayev (born 1965), Russian football player and coach 
Daler Kuzyayev (born 1993), Russian football player of Tatar descent
Mikhail Kuzyayev (born 1988), Russian football player

Russian-language surnames